The 2009 IAAF World Cross Country Championships took place on March 28, 2009.  The races were held at the Al Bisharat Golf Course in Amman, Jordan.  Four races took place, one for men, women, junior men and junior women respectively. All races encompassed both individual and team competition. Amman is also only the second occasion on which Asia has hosted the World Cross Country Championships, which are the oldest IAAF World Athletics Series event, first celebrated under the IAAF banner in 1973.

Competition notes 

The senior male team for Kenya won their 22nd team title in 24 years despite the fact that no senior male runner from Kenya has won an individual title since 1999.

Florence Kiplagat was the first Kenyan senior women's winner since Helen Chepngeno in 1994. She was quoted saying, ‘’I would like to thank God,” she said. “Kenya has not won since 1994. We are determined to perform at the same level as Kenyan men.”

Further race reports of the event were given in The New York Times and for the IAAF.

Medallists

Race results

Senior men's race (12 km)

Complete results for senior men and for senior men's teams were published.

Note: Athletes in parentheses did not score for the team result.

Junior men's race (8 km)
Complete results for junior men and for junior men's teams  were published.

Note: Athletes in parentheses did not score for the team result.

Senior women's race (8 km)

Complete results for senior women and for senior women's teams were published.

Note: Athletes in parentheses did not score for the team result.

Junior women's race (6 km)
Complete results for junior women and for junior women's teams were published.

Note: Athletes in parentheses did not score for the team result.

Medal table (unofficial)

Note: Totals include both individual and team medals, with medals in the team competition counting as one medal.

Participation
According to an unofficial count, 459 athletes from 59 countries participated, two athletes less (senior women) than the official number published

 (14)
 (2)
 (1)
 (18)
 (1)
 (8)
 (1)
 (1)
 (4)
 (10)
 (7)
 (21)
 (6)
 (1)
 (6)
 (23)
 (24)
 (1)
 (10)
 (2)
 (1)
 (1)
 (4)
 (2)
 (6)
 (23)
 (18)
 (24)
 (4)
 (1)
 (4)
 (2)
 (24)
 (1)
 (2)
 (1)
 (1)
 (2)
 (1)
 (2)
 (14)
 (6)
 (7)
 (8)
 (2)
 (1)
 (23)
 (19)
 (6)
 (2)
 (2)
 (6)
 (10)
 (11)
 (24)
 (23)
 (2)
 (5)
 (3)

See also
 2009 IAAF World Cross Country Championships – Senior men's race
 2009 IAAF World Cross Country Championships – Junior men's race
 2009 IAAF World Cross Country Championships – Senior women's race
 2009 IAAF World Cross Country Championships – Junior women's race
 2009 in athletics (track and field)

References

External links
 Official IAAF competition website

 
World Cross Country Championships
World Athletics Cross Country Championships
International athletics competitions hosted by Jordan
Sports competitions in Amman
IAAF
Cross country running in Jordan
21st century in Amman
IAAF